Afriski is the only skiing resort in Lesotho, located 3050 m above sea-level (just below Mahlasela Pass, 3222 m) in the Maluti Mountains, operating in Southern Africa near the northern border of Lesotho with South Africa. It is one of only two ski resorts in southern Africa.  The resort is a 4.5-hour drive from Johannesburg or Pretoria via the steep tarred Moteng pass and the Mahlasela pass; it sits along Highway A1. The resort can accommodate about 320 people and offers a 1 km ski slope, beginners slope and operates during the winter months (June–August). Afriski also operates in the summer months and offer a variety of activities, from mountain biking, guided Enduro motorbike trips, paintball, hiking, trail running, and more.

See also
 Tiffindell Ski Resort - South Africa's only ski resort

References

Ski areas and resorts in Lesotho